The 2022 Dutch Open (officially referred to as the 2022 TOTO Dutch Open Darts) was the 49th edition of the Dutch Open organised by the World Darts Federation. The tournament was held at the De Bonte Wever in Assen, Netherlands. Tournament has been awarded Platinum ranking status, with a total prize fund €27,650.

Ross Montgomery who won the previous men's tournament was absent from the event, having switched to the Professional Darts Corporation in January 2022. Aileen de Graaf as three-time champion was defending women's title, but she lost in quarter-finals to later finalist Rhian O'Sullivan.

Jelle Klaasen became the new champion. This is his first victory in the World Darts Federation tournament since the victory at 2006 BDO World Darts Championship. Beau Greaves won the women's tournament. The remaining youth's trophies going to Dylan van Lierop, Roos van der Velde and Dominik Kočik.

Prize money

Men's

Seeds
Seeding was take place in accordance of the WDF Rankings for 25 May 2022. The players was seeded in accordance with WDF regulations, but not always as the first match in the section. The first byes go to the seeded players, but after that the byes are equally divided across the sheets in a random place on the sheet. Jelle Klaasen was the champion without a seeding position.

Draw (Last 32 onwards)

Women's

Seeds
Seeding was take place in accordance of the WDF Rankings for 25 May 2022. The players was seeded in accordance with WDF regulations, but not always as the first match in the section. The first byes go to the seeded players, but after that the byes are equally divided across the sheets in a random place on the sheet.

Draw (Last 32 onwards)

Boys (U18)

Seeds
Seeding was take place in accordance of the WDF Rankings for 25 May 2022. The players was seeded in accordance with WDF regulations, but not always as the first match in the section. The first byes go to the seeded players, but after that the byes are equally divided across the sheets in a random place on the sheet. No one from top-ranking players advanced to final stage.

Draw (Last 8 onwards)

Girls

Seeds
Seeding was take place in accordance of the WDF Rankings for 25 May 2022. The players was seeded in accordance with WDF regulations, but not always as the first match in the section. The first byes go to the seeded players, but after that the byes are equally divided across the sheets in a random place on the sheet.

  (semi-finals)
  (runner-up)

Draw (Last 8 onwards)

Boys (U14)

Draw (Last 8 onwards)

References

Dutch Open
Dutch Open
Dutch Open
Dutch Open